The men's high jump event  at the 1999 IAAF World Indoor Championships was held on March 7.

Results

References
Results

High
High jump at the World Athletics Indoor Championships